Eric Cervini (born 1992) is an American author, activist, and historian of LGBTQ politics and culture. His debut book, The Deviant's War: The Homosexual vs. The United States of America (2020) was a New York Times Bestseller  and a finalist for the Pulitzer Prize. He also runs a queer history newsletter, Queer History 101, which focuses on sharing LGBTQ history.

Life 
Cervini was born in California and raised in Round Rock, Texas by a single mother, Lynn Cervini. He attended Westwood High School, where he graduated with an International Baccalaureate diploma in 2010.

Cervini came out as a gay days before enrolling at Harvard College, where he graduated in 2014 with an BA in History. After a year earning his Master of Philosophy in historical studies as the Lionel de Jersey Harvard Scholar at the Department of Politics and International Studies at Emmanuel College, Cambridge in 2015, he won a Gates Cambridge Scholarship to continue his research as part of a doctorate program. He received a PhD in history in 2019.

Cervini lives in Los Angeles.

Career 
After seven years researching the pre-Stonewall riots homophile movement, Cervini signed a book deal with Farrar, Straus, & Giroux in 2018. In the months leading up to the book release, Cervini started a podcast The Deviant’s World, and a Youtube and Instagram series, The Magic Closet, to share his research that did not make it into the book.

The Deviant's War: The Homosexual vs. The United States of America 
In June 2020, Cervini’s book, The Deviant's War: The Homosexual vs. The United States of America, was released and became a New York Times Bestseller—the first work of LGBTQ history to make the list in 27 years. The Deviant's War is the first full-length biography of Frank Kameny, a key figure in the gay liberation movement. Kameny is widely considered the “grandfather of the gay rights movement”. The Washington Post wrote, “Kameny may be responsible for more fundamental social change in the post-World War II world than any other American of his generation.” Cervini delves into the life of astronomer Kameny, who was a pioneer in early homophile movement for LGBTQ rights in the decades leading up to the 1969 Stonewall riots, and beyond. Gay Pride, unnamed until the 1970s, was argued in concept by Kameny to the Supreme Court of the U. S. in 1961. In the 1970s, Kameny scored numerous victories, one being the decision to strike homosexuality from the American Psychiatric Association’s manual of mental disorders; “the singular accomplishment that made all future LGBTQ progress possible”.

Through a  “painstakingly detailed” investigative look into Kameny’s activism—that set him up to be “ostracized and targeted by everyone from his neighbors to the FBI”—Cervini extrapolates for insight into the experiences of other LGBTQ people of the time. Cervini’s “exhaustive” research used declassified documents, and forty thousand personal documents, and tells Kameny’s story including the closeted gay subculture, coupled with the government fear that LGBTQ people were communists and/or security risks. He faced enormous challenges as LGBTQ people faced the same social disdain and institutionalized hatred “faced by blacks and Jews, buttressed by centuries of religious bigotry” but were more loathed. He also covers other key figures in early LGBTQ history including Jack Nichols, Barbara Gittings, Jim Fouratt, Randy Wicker, Marsha P. Johnson, and Sylvia Rivera. In doing so Cervini shows the many intersections of the early LGBTQ rights movement to the Black Freedom Movement, the New Left, lesbian activism, and trans resistance. New York magazine's "Approval Matrix" placed The Deviant's War in its quadrant for "brilliant" and "highbrow" and The Washington Post book review also called it "brilliant," as well as a "rich portrait of Kameny."

Awards and honors 
Cervini was named to Logo30’s 2020 list of influential LGBTQ figures. The Deviant's War was named to the New York Times Editor’s Choice Recommended Books, won the Randy Shilts Award and was a finalist for the 2021 Pulitzer Prize for History.

Book 
 2020: The Deviant's War: The Homosexual vs. The United States of America, Farrar, Straus, & Giroux

References 

1992 births
21st-century American writers
21st-century American non-fiction writers
Harvard College alumni
American gay writers
Living people